Parliamentary elections were held in Paraguay in 1960 after President Alfredo Stroessner had dissolved Congress. The elections were boycotted by the opposition in protest at insufficient guarantees of freedom. Subsequently all 60 seats were won by the Colorado Party.

Results

References

Paraguay
1960 in Paraguay
Elections in Paraguay
Alfredo Stroessner